Zahoorabad is a constituency of the Uttar Pradesh Legislative Assembly covering the city of Zahoorabad in the Ghazipur district of Uttar Pradesh, India.

Zahoorabad is one of five assembly constituencies in the Ballia Lok Sabha constituency. Since 2008, this assembly constituency is numbered 377 amongst 403 constituencies.

Election results

2022

2017
Suheldev Bharatiya Samaj Party candidate Om Prakash Rajbhar won in 2017 Uttar Pradesh Legislative Elections by defeating Bahujan Samaj Party candidate Kalicharan by a margin of 18,081 votes.

Members of Legislative Assembly
1989: Virendra Singh, Indian National Congress
1991: Surendra Singh, Janta Dal
1993: Isteyak Ansari, Bahujan Samaj Party
1996: Ganesh, Bharatiya Janata Party
2002: Kali Charan, Bahujan Samaj Party
2007: Kali Charan, Bahujan Samaj Party
2012: Syeda Shadab Fatima, Samajwadi Party
2017: Om Prakash Rajbhar, Suheldev Bhartiya Samaj Party

References

External links
 

Assembly constituencies of Uttar Pradesh
Politics of Ghazipur district